Charles Bazinet (July 20, 1845 – March 3, 1916) was a Canadian politician who served in the House of Commons of Canada.

Born in Joliette, Canada East and educated at the Collège de Joliette, Bazinet was a lumber merchant by occupation and owned a sawmill. In 1867, he married Marie Philomene Courtois. He was first elected to the House of Commons for the electoral district of Joliette in the 1896 federal election. A Liberal, he was re-elected in 1900. Bazinet also served as mayor of St-Jean-de-Matha.

References

1845 births
1916 deaths
Liberal Party of Canada MPs
Members of the House of Commons of Canada from Quebec
Mayors of places in Quebec